Megalodontoidea is a superfamily of fossil bivalves in the order Megalodontida. 

The following families are included in Megalodontoidea:
†Ceratomyopsidae
†Dicerocardiidae
†Megalodontidae
†Pachyrismatidae
†Wallowaconchidae

References

Bivalve superfamilies
Bivalve taxonomy
Prehistoric bivalves